Jovan Kljajić (born September 11, 2001) is a Montenegrin professional basketball player for Gran Canaria. He is a 1.98 m tall shooting guard, and he also represents the  Montenegro national team internationally.

References

External links
Jovan Kljajić at acb.com
Jovan Kljajić at competiciones.feb.es

2001 births
Living people
Shooting guards 
Montenegrin men's basketball players 
CB Gran Canaria players
Bilbao Basket players
BC Prienai players